Dasotraline (INN; former developmental code name SEP-225,289) is a serotonin-norepinephrine-dopamine reuptake inhibitor (SNDRI) that was under development by Sunovion for the treatment of attention-deficit hyperactivity disorder (ADHD) and binge eating disorder (BED). Structurally, dasotraline is a stereoisomer of desmethylsertraline (DMS), which is an active metabolite of the marketed selective serotonin reuptake inhibitor (SSRI) antidepressant sertraline (Zoloft).

Adverse Effects
In phase I clinical trials for ADHD, test subjects reported the following side effects:
 Loss of appetite
 Dehydration
 Dry mouth
 Nausea
 Insomnia
 Anxiety
 Panic attacks
 Headaches

History 
In 2017, the U.S. Food and Drug Administration accepted Sunovion's New Drug Application (NDA) for review for the treatment of ADHD; however, the NDA was ultimately rejected citing the need for additional studies to determine efficacy and tolerability. In July 2019, Sunovion’s NDA for the treatment of BED was accepted with an expected action date of May 2020. In May 2020, Sunovion halted its drug development program for dasotraline, withdrawing both NDAs for ADHD and BED.

See also 
 Centanafadine
 Indatraline
 Lometraline
 Tametraline

References

Further reading 
Liming Shao Patent
  

Asymmetry Patent
 

Serotonin–norepinephrine–dopamine reuptake inhibitors
Chlorobenzenes
Amines